Erfan Zeneli (born 28 December 1986) is a Finnish footballer of Kosovar Albanian descent who currently plays for SexyPöxyt as a striker or left winger. Besides Finland, he has played in Israel and Kazakhstan.

Career

Club
In February 2016, Zeneli went on trial with Kazakhstan Premier League side FC Shakhter Karagandy.

On 17 June 2016, Zeneli had his contract with Shakhter Karagandy terminated by mutual consent, going on to season a contract with FC Inter Turku for the rest of the 2016 season on 19 July 2016.

International
In April 2012 Zeneli declared to the media that he would welcome a convocation to be part of the Albania national football team and has been since in contact with coach Gianni de Biasi. He decided to play for Finland national football team.

Honours

Individual
 Veikkausliiga Midfielder of the year 2013

References

External links
 Profile at HJK.fi
 Stats at Veikkausliiga.com
 

1986 births
Living people
Sportspeople from Vushtrri
Kosovan emigrants to Finland
Association football wingers
Kosovan footballers
Finnish footballers
Finland under-21 international footballers
Finland international footballers
Helsingin Jalkapalloklubi players
Klubi 04 players
Maccabi Petah Tikva F.C. players
FC Shakhter Karagandy players
FC Inter Turku players
Seinäjoen Jalkapallokerho players
Rovaniemen Palloseura players
AC Kajaani players
FC Viikingit players
Veikkausliiga players
Ykkönen players
Israeli Premier League players
Kazakhstan Premier League players
Finnish expatriate footballers
Expatriate footballers in Israel
Finnish expatriate sportspeople in Israel
Expatriate footballers in Kazakhstan
Finnish expatriate sportspeople in Kazakhstan
Finnish people of Albanian descent
Finnish people of Yugoslav descent